Kilroy may refer to:

 Kilroy (surname)
 Kilroy (TV series), a BBC day time chat show hosted by Robert Kilroy-Silk
 Kilroy, a main character beginning with Season 2 in the television series Taken
 Kilroy's College, a distance education school in Ireland
 Kilroy International A/S, a European company specializing in travel-related youth products

See also 
Kilroy was here

 Gilroy (disambiguation)